Fan Pengfei (born 15 February 1992) is a Chinese singer, songwriter and musician in pop music. He was born in Zhengzhou, Henan.

Career

Early life 
Fan Pengfei studied music in his spare time in college. He wrote lyrics after graduating.

2012 to 2014 
Fan Pengfei released his first album "Do not hurt me" (不疼我) on 28 June 2012. He released his second album "Holding the Son of Heaven to Order Princes" (挟天子以令诸侯) on 3 March 2013. He released his third album "Li Family" (李家姑娘) on 15 March 2014. He released his fourth music album "Wandering Together" (一起去流浪) on 21 October 2014.

2015 to 2022 
Fan Pengfei released his single "Between You and Me" (你我之间) on 22 November 2021.

Discography

Albums

References

External links 
Fan Pengfei Sina Weibo
Fan Pengfei Musicbrainz
Fan Pengfei Discogs

1992 births
Living people
Chinese Mandopop singers
Mandopop singer-songwriters
Chinese male singer-songwriters
21st-century Chinese male singers
Singers from Henan